KZN may refer to:

KwaZulu-Natal, a province of South Africa
 Kantonsschule Zürich Nord, a school in Switzerland 
 Kazan International Airport, Tatarstan, Russia (IATA code: KZN) 
 KSL (radio network), Utah, United States (original call sign: KZN)